The Thirteen Chairs is a 1969 comedy film directed by Nicolas Gessner and Luciano Lucignani and starring Sharon Tate, Vittorio Gassman and Orson Welles, and featuring Vittorio De Sica, Terry-Thomas, Mylène Demongeot, Grégoire Aslan, Tim Brooke-Taylor and Lionel Jeffries. It is based on the 1928 satirical novel The Twelve Chairs by Soviet authors Ilf and Petrov, which has been adapted many times (including a 1970 version directed by Mel Brooks).

Plot
Mario Beretti is a young Italian-American barber who runs a barber shop in New York City located near a construction site that boasts few customers. His life reaches a turning point when he is notified of the death of his aunt living in Lavenham, England, who named him her sole heir.

Mario rushes to England and learns that his inheritance consists of not much; only thirteen antique chairs that have a certain value. He sells them in order to cover his transportation costs, but soon learns from his Aunt Laura's last message that inside one of the chairs is a fortune in jewels. He tries to buy back the chairs, but is unsuccessful in doing so. With the help of lovely American antiques dealer Pat, working in the antiques shop in front of Aunt Laura's house, where he sold the chairs, the two then set out on a bizarre quest to track down the chairs that takes them from London to Paris and to Rome. Along the way, they meet a bunch of equally bizarre characters, including the driver of a furniture moving van named Albert; a prostitute named Judy; Maurice, the leader of a traveling theater company that stages a poor version of Strange Case of Dr Jekyll and Mr Hyde; the Italian entrepreneur Carlo Di Seta; and his vivacious daughter Stefanella.

The bizarre chase ends in Rome, where the chair containing the jewels finds its way into a truck and is collected by nuns who auction it off to charity. With nothing much left to do as a result of the failure of his quest, Mario travels back to New York City by ship as Pat sees him off and waves goodbye to him.

The film ends with Mario returning to New York City and to his barber shop. His friends over at the other (and more lavish) shop join him, as do two construction workers and his last customer Randomhouse. It is there that Mario makes a strange discovery: shortly before his departure for Europe, he invented a way to make hair regrow miraculously. He then laughs ecstatically over his discovery.

Cast

Production and release
The Thirteen Chairs was filmed from February to May 1969. Orson Welles and Tim Brooke-Taylor had their scenes filmed during a break from shooting Welles' comedic film One Man Band. Brooke-Taylor recalled:

Because the script for Sharon Tate's scenes called for several semi-nude scenes, the director arranged to film those scenes first. As filming (and her pregnancy) progressed, the director obscured Tate's stomach with large purses and scarves. This is most apparent in the scene following her ride in the furniture mover's van.

The Thirteen Chairs was Tate's final film, with many people saying that she had a knack for comedy and were excited for her next film contract (equal to over $1,000,000 in today's money).

Home media
The film was released through rental only by Force Video in 1986 under the Thirteen Chairs title, and again a year later by Continental Video, under the original 12 + 1 title. On 12 March 2008, the film was released on DVD in Italy by 01 Distribution. This version is in Italian, lacks English subtitles, and does not include an English audio track.

References

External links
 
 
 

1969 films
1969 comedy films
1960s English-language films
Embassy Pictures films
English-language French films
English-language Italian films
Films based on Russian novels
Films directed by Nicolas Gessner
Films scored by Carlo Rustichelli
Films scored by Stelvio Cipriani
Films set in London
Films set in New York City
Films set in Paris
Films set in Rome
Films set in Suffolk
Films shot in London
Films shot in New York City
Films shot in Paris
Films shot in Rome
Films shot in Tuscany
French comedy films
Ilf and Petrov
Italian comedy films
1960s Italian films
1960s French films